BMVC may refer to:

Be My Valentine Charlie
Bishop Moore Vidyapith Cherthala
British Machine Vision Conference